Qoltuq (also Romanized as Qoltūq and Qaltūq; also known as Koltukh, Kultūkh, and Qotūq) is a village in Qoltuq Rural District of the Central District of Zanjan County, Zanjan province, Iran. At the 2006 National Census, its population was 1,287 in 323 households. The following census in 2011 counted 1,197 people in 374 households. The latest census in 2016 showed a population of 986 people in 333 households; it was the largest village in its rural district.

References 

Zanjan County

Populated places in Zanjan Province

Populated places in Zanjan County